Oldroyd Island is a small island  northwest of Magnetic Island, lying off the Vestfold Hills in the east part of Prydz Bay. Mapped by Norwegian cartographers from air photos taken by the Lars Christensen Expedition, 1936–37. Remapped by ANARE (Australian National Antarctic Research Expeditions) (1957–58) and named by Antarctic Names Committee of Australia (ANCA) for K.C. Oldroyd, weather observer at Davis Station in 1960.

See also 
 List of antarctic and sub-antarctic islands

Islands of Princess Elizabeth Land